Gilles Sanders (born 9 August 1964) is a former French racing cyclist. He rode in three editions of the Tour de France between 1987 and 1989.

References

External links
 

1964 births
Living people
French male cyclists
People from Narbonne
Sportspeople from Aude
Cyclists from Occitania (administrative region)